My Secret Romance is a 2017 South Korean television series starring Sung Hoon and Song Ji-eun. It aired on cable network OCN at 21:00 (KST) every Monday and Tuesday, from April 17 to May 30, 2017 for 14 episodes. It was also released on SK Telecom's "oksusu" mobile app.

My Secret Romance was selected in the 2017 Top Creator Audition held by KOCCA. The series is the first OCN drama to air on Monday and Tuesday, as well as the first romance-themed OCN drama.

Synopsis
Jin-wook and Yoo-mi meet at a Gangwon-do resort and get caught up in a series of misunderstandings and accidents. Yoo-mi is there to attend her mother's second wedding while Jin-wook is there working as a bellhop (a position given to him by his Chairman father to teach him responsibility). Yoo-mi is charmed by Jin-wook's sly and playful personality, and they unexpectedly spend the night together. However, Yoo-mi disappears in the morning, leaving Jin-wook feeling perplexed and insulted.

Three years later, the two meet again when Yoo-mi becomes a nutritionist at the company cafeteria where Jin-wook works. It seems that once a playboy Jin-wook, has given up his carefree life and works at the company owned by his father. He has feelings for Yoo-mi and has kept her bra-pad as a memory of the night that they spent together. At first, he is strict toward her, though it is only because he is looking for reasons to be near her. He later confesses this to her and agrees to wait for her.

During the three years, Yoo-mi's mother has had a second child, Dong-goo, who is now three years old. Upon looking at Dong-goo, Jin-wook's father, the Chairman, mistakes him as Yoo-mi's son, not half-brother. The Chairman tells Jin-wook, admonishing him for having a child out of wedlock with a nutritionist. After finding this out, Jin-wook believes that he has wronged Yoo-mi and warms up to her, seeming to accept Dong-goo as his son. The misunderstanding is eventually cleared up but Yoo-mi gets upset at Jin-wook, accusing him of being with her only because he thought he had a child with her. Then enters a pretty girl, Joo Hye-ri (Jung Da-sol) who is deemed a "suitable" wife for Jin-wook. Yoo-mi's writer friend, Jung Hyun-tae (Kim Jae-young), is shown to have a secret crush on her. With all drama revolving around main characters' mothers, Cha Jin-wook and Lee Yoo-mi finally manage to keep their love strong, while also resolving their personal problems with their parents.

The drama ends with Hye-ri "traveling together" with Hyun-tae and Yoo-mi and Jin-wook attending Yoo-mi's mother's re-wedding and Jin-wook saying "Today is D-day. Do you know how much I've waited for this day?" and Yoo-mi replying "Me too."

Cast

Main
 Sung Hoon as Cha Jin-wook (Gino Cha)
 A prickly second generation chaebol and director of a company owned by his dad. He was playful and loved partying. After Yoo-mi disappeared from his sight, he turned into a hard-working and serious man while taking good care of his father's company. 
 Song Ji-eun as Lee Yoo-mi (Yumi Lee)
 A nutritionist who feels insecure about other people's opinions and is also scared to wear revealing clothes due to her mother's controversial reputation on society.
 Kim Jae-young as Jung Hyun-tae (Jeffery Jung) 
 A successful travel writer and the owner of a book cafe. Warm and friendly, he is Yoo-mi's best friend. He has a crush on Yoo-mi, but he never tries to show it to her. 
 Jung Da-sol as Joo Hye-ri (Annie Joo)
 A young and beautiful announcer who is popular with men, but has an unrequited crush on Jin-wook.

Supporting

People around Jin-wook
 Lee Kan-hee as Kim Ae-ryung, Jin-wook's mother
 Kim Jong-goo as Cha Dae-bok, Jin-wook's father
 Park Shin-woon as Jang Woo-jin, Jin-wook's secretary

People around Yoo-mi
 Nam Gi-ae as Jo Mi-hee, Yoo-mi's mother
 Joo Sang-hyuk as Dong-goo, Yoo-mi's little brother
 Kim Si-young as Wang Bok-ja
 Im Do-yoon as Kang Je-ni
 Lee Hae-in as Jang Eun-bi
 Baek Seung-heon as Lee Shin-hwa

Special appearance
 Jeon So-min as Girl in the Club (Ep. 1)

Original soundtrack

Part 1

Part 2

Part 3

Part 4

List of Episodes

International broadcast
 In Sri Lanka, the drama is available to stream on-demand via Iflix with Sinhalese and English subtitles.
 In the Philippines, the drama premiered on GMA Network on November 27, 2017, dubbed in Tagalog. 
 In the Southeast Asia, the drama was aired on K+ Asia on April 18, 2017.

References

External links
  
 
 

OCN television dramas
South Korean romantic comedy television series
2017 South Korean television series debuts
2017 South Korean television series endings
Korean-language television shows
Wavve original programming